The Frosty is a frozen dairy dessert of the American fast-food restaurant chain Wendy's. The Frosty was among the first five items introduced on the Wendy's menu.  

Wendy's founder Dave Thomas created the original "light chocolate" Frosty himself by combining the chocolate and vanilla flavor, as he thought that a pure chocolate flavor would overwhelm the taste of the restaurant's hamburgers. Thomas based the Frosty on the milkshakes he drank in Detroit as a kid, and initially created the Frosty to be thick enough to require a spoon to eat.

Specialty Flavors
Although a signature consistency of the Wendy’s Frosty—a cross between a milkshake and soft-serve ice cream—, over the years Wendy's has occasionally introduced new flavor variations. In August 2006, a vanilla flavor was introduced after repeated customer requests. In the summer of 2022, the vanilla Frosty was temporarily replaced with a strawberry Frosty. In November 2022, Wendy's released the new peppermint Frosty for the holidays; this is the third new flavor released and temporarily replaced the vanilla Frosty.

See also 

 Slushy
 Slurpee
 Shaved Ice
Shake

References

External links

 Frosty page at Wendy's website

Ice cream brands
Products introduced in 1969
Wendy's foods